ZFK Naše Taksi (Macedonian: Женски фудбалски клуб Наше Такси, meaning Our Taxi) was a women's football club from Skopje the capital of North Macedonia. Founded in 2010, the team started directly in the Macedonian women's football championship and went on to win its first championship and the national cup. They defended both titles the next year and played two seasons in the UEFA Women's Champions League qualifying round. The club dissolved before the start of the next season.

History
The founding of the club was decided on 19 June 2010 with the official documents filed on 15 July 2010. At that time the club became Skopje's only women's football club, though earlier clubs existed in the city.

The club was dissolved in 2012.

Titles
 2 Macedonian women's football championship: 2010–11, 2011–12
 2 Macedonian women's cup: 2010–11, 2011–12

Squad
The 2011–12 champions league squad.

UEFA Competitions Record
The team made its European debut in 2011 when they hosted a mini-tournament for the 2011–12 UEFA Women's Champions League. With two wins and a 1–3 loss against top seeded women's team of BSC Young Boys they took a second place. Narrowly missing the round of 32 by goal difference in comparison of the best runners-up.

References

External links

Profile at uefa.com

Women's football clubs in North Macedonia
Association football clubs established in 2010
Association football clubs disestablished in 2012
Football clubs in Skopje